Mark Hemel (born 1966 in Emmen, Netherlands) is a Dutch architect and designer, and co-founder (with Barbara Kuit) of the Amsterdam-based architectural practice Information Based Architecture. He is best known as an architect of the Canton Tower in Guangzhou.

Mark Hemel's view

Mark's focus is on "global architecture". His main interest is to play a role in the expression and development of our contemporary culture. In his view, architecture can play an important and positive role in shedding light on potential routes "our" global culture could take.

Mark Hemel: "The next generation of planners, architects and designers will have to get used thinking big, so making reference to big environmental challenges and major expected world population dynamics. Architects in particular will find themselves less and less powerful. We therefore have to focus on making our work more "information based" or we might get side-lined and more and more irrelevant".

His solution is to strive for 'TRUE' integration of the different aspects of design and planning, starting with small steps at the time. He pleads for getting rid of the modern valuation-system of measuring everything in terms of money, efficiency and functionality, and instead calls for a more holistic valuation system that weighs small but essential and strategic influences against the more superficial obvious influences. Mark proclaims that "recent decades of science have shown us that we should not ignore the small, and that we should focus on the interrelationship of seemingly independent things. The world is a global world: everything in it, including the people, form one holistic whole. We should go beyond Modernism's mayor fault: splitting problems into sub-sets in order to solve them independently, in the process destroying the interrelationship."

He therefore pleads for "biological intelligence" to be introduced in the architecture and planning professions. Hemel is currently working on a book in which the term "biological intelligence" will be introduced.

Influences
Hemel was educated by American theorist Jeffrey Kipniss and UK architect Zaha Hadid as well as Dutch architects Herman Herzberger and Carel Weeber. He was particularly influenced by the books of Richard Dawkins (The Selfish Gene 1976) Kevin Kelly (Out of Control 1995), Ilya Prigogine (Order Out of Chaos 1984) and Douglas Hofstadter (Gödel, Escher, Bach). After his post graduate studies at the Architectural Association in London, Mark began teaching at the AA.

Besides an interest for everything that evolved or subconsciously developed, Mark also has a great interest in mathematics and geometry. During his studies in Delft, he pursued mathematical courses in chaos theory. The reason for his interest in this is that chaos theory seems to explain why Modernism, in its purest form, is doomed to lead to disaster, and that the alternative "synthesis and integration" bears much more prospect.
"In contemporary architecture you see lots of forms that refer to nothing. And indeed, we want to make designs that are more 'informed'."

Hemel was chosen as one of Design-Build Network's "New Young Architects to Watch for 2010".

Biography
Mark Hemel was born in 1966 in Emmen, Netherlands. Hemel graduated in 1993 from the Delft University of Technology, in the Netherlands and in 1996 from the Architectural Association in London in the Graduate Design Program. After his studies in the Netherlands he received a scholarship for a 1-year research project in Africa and Asia from the Netherlands Foundation for Visual Arts, Design and Architecture. During this year he traveled through Ghana, Burkina Faso, Mali, Senegal, India, and Indonesia concentrating his research on organic city-developments. Beside this he also developed an interest in vernacular tactics to cope with the omnipresent harsh environmental circumstances which he came across in Africa and Asia. His studies focused on the Dogon in Mali, the cities of Djenne, the people on the island of Nias, Indonesia, and the southern temple cities of India.

Hemel worked and lived the first 9 years (1995–2003) of his professional life in London, United Kingdom. In 2003 he returned to the Netherlands to set up his practise in Amsterdam.

Hemel is a tutor and educator. He has been a Unit-master at the Architectural Association in London from 1999 to 2008, and design-tutor of the post-graduate Environment and Energy program at the AA in London, since 2002. Over these years, he experimented with developing performance-based architectural projects. Some of his students became very successful, executing his new approach to architecture, and were awarded various prizes. In 2003 Hemel was awarded the RIBA tutor prize.

Hemel has been active in multi-disciplinary groups, trying to reinvigorate the dried-up architectural debate. He is a member of the do-group; an international inter-disciplinary research-group, and participates in the Performing Arts Labs; a UK-based architectural research group sponsored by the United Kingdom's National Endowment for Science Technology and the Arts.

Hemel is registered as an architect at the Stichting Bureau Architecten Register, The Hague, the Netherlands.

Professional practice
Hemel co-founded the firm 'Information Based Architecture' together with his partner Barbara Kuit in 1998 while they were still based in London. The office is called "information based" in order to clearly break with the common state of architecture at that time that was producing uninformed "blobs". In 2003 they moved their office to Amsterdam, while they focus their work currently on Europe, China and Africa. Hemel's attitude to architectural work can best be explained by the following statement: he believes that "architecture should be valued only after the physical form of architecture has come into being, and we should get away of valuing architecture on the basis of conceptual text. Architecture cannot fully be photographed, nor be fully described in text, and cannot be fully captured in an image."

Publications and reference material
Hemel and Kuit's work has been published and exhibited widely. In 2002 they were shortlisted for the Young Architects of the Year Award in the United Kingdom. They have received support by the Dutch Department of Trade and Industry and received several encouragement grants by the Netherlands Foundation for Visual Arts, Design and Architecture.

Hemel is the author of a book entitled Supermodel, the making of the world's tallest TV tower (2011).

References

External links

IBA website
Canton Tower 
National Geographic Documentary on the Mark Hemel's work
Doc-Eye documentary on Mark Hemel
Profile of Mark Hemel on Archined.nl 
Canton Tower in Wired magazine
Article on Hemel and the Canton Tower in ND Daily 
Article on Hemel and the Canton Tower in Nanfang Daily 
Article on Hemel on XinHuanet 
Hemel's Biography on Information Based Architecture's website
Hemel receives RIBA tutor prize
Hemels major achievement as a professional designer and architect is the Guangzhou/Canton Towerin China
World Architecture News WAN - news article website on opening on the Canton Tower

1966 births
Living people
People from Emmen, Netherlands
20th-century Dutch architects
21st-century Dutch architects